Royal Naval Air Station Merryfield, commonly known as  RNAS Merryfield (ICAO: EGDI) is an air station of the Royal Navy's Fleet Air Arm located  north-west of Ilminster, and  south-east of Taunton, in the English county of Somerset, in England.

History

The following squadrons were located here at some point:
700 Naval Air Squadron
766 Naval Air Squadron
802 Naval Air Squadron
809 Naval Air Squadron
891 Naval Air Squadron
893 Naval Air Squadron
894 Naval Air Squadron

Current use
The site is mainly used for military helicopter exercises, and there are a large number of lettered helicopter landing spots spread across the site on the taxiways.

See also
RNAS Yeovilton (HMS Heron) — parent station of RNAS Merryfield

References

Royal Naval Air Stations in Somerset
Airports in England
South Somerset
1971 establishments in England